David Constantin (born 1974) is a filmmaker from Mauritius.

Career

Constantin was born in Mauritius Island in 1974. 
He obtained a degree in Information and Communication, and then attended the ESAV (Higher School of Audiovisuals) in Toulouse.
He made his first short film in 1998.
After spending five years in France studying cinematography he returned to Mauritius in 2003.
In 2007 he organized ILE COURTS, the first short film festival in Mauritius.
David Constantin has established an audiovisual research laboratory at the Charles Baudelaire Cultural Centre.
He gives introductory courses for teachers on analysis of the image.
He has given seminars on aspects of film for the Université populaire de l'Ile Maurice.

Work

In 2002 Constantin directed and produced the short film Diego l'interdite (Diego the Forbidden).
This is a documentary about the deportation of the people of the Chagos Island in the Indian Ocean by the US and UK governments.
The film won the European Grand Prix of First Films 2002 and Vues d'Afrique 2003.
In the years that followed he directed and produced a number of documentaries and short films.
He won awards in film festivals such as Vues d’Afrique (Montreal), Amiens (France), Réunion and Milan.
His 2005 short Bisanville (l'Autobus) won prizes at the International Film Festival of Amiens in 2005 and the 12th Film Festival of Africa and the Islands, Reunion 2005.
His short comedy Made In Mauritius was screened at the 2010 African Film Festival of Cordoba.
It was also screened at the 22nd African, Asian and Latin American Film Festival in Milan in March 2012.

Filmography
Selected videos:

References

Film director

Living people
1974 births
Mauritian filmmakers